Richard Maxwell may refer to:

 Richard Maxwell (academic) (1919–2016), American professor of law
 Richard Maxwell (director) (born 1967), American experimental theater director and playwright

See also

Maxwell (surname)